Tony MacAlpine is the self-titled tenth studio album by guitarist Tony MacAlpine, released on June 14, 2011 through Favored Nations Entertainment (United States) and King Records (Japan, Korea and Taiwan). The album is MacAlpine's first solo release in ten years following Chromaticity (2001), and the first to feature his extensive use of seven- and eight-string guitars—a staple of his playing which began in the days he spent with Planet X throughout the 2000s.

Track listing

Personnel
Tony MacAlpine – guitar, keyboard, drum programming, bass (except track 2), production
Virgil Donati – drums (tracks 1, 5, 10)
Marco Minnemann – drums (tracks 3, 4, 8, 12)
Philip Bynoe – bass (track 2)
Ulrich Wild – mixing (except track 6)
Geoff Allen Ambrose – mixing (track 6)
Raidar – mixing assistance (except track 6)
Dave Collins – mastering
Michael Mesker – executive production

References

Tony MacAlpine albums
2011 albums
Favored Nations albums
King Records (Japan) albums